Lady Sarah may refer to:

Sarah Hughes (journalist) (1972–2021), British journalist known by the pseudonym 'Lady Sarah'
Lady Sarah McCorquodale, née Spencer (born 1955), sister of Diana, Princess of Wales
Lady Sarah Chatto, née Armstrong-Jones (born 1964), daughter of Princess Margaret, Countess of Snowdon
Lady Sarah Lennox (1745–1826), daughter of Charles Lennox, 2nd Duke of Richmond
Sarah Lennox, Duchess of Richmond, née Lady Sarah Cadogan (1705–1751), wife of Charles Lennox, 2nd Duke of Richmond
Sarah Lyttelton, Baroness Lyttelton, née Lady Sarah Spencer (1787–1870), wife of William Lyttelton, 3rd Baron Lyttelton
Sarah Villiers, Countess of Jersey, née Lady Sarah Fane (1785–1867), wife of George Child Villiers, 5th Earl of Jersey
Lady Sarah Wilson, née Spencer-Churchill (1865–1929), daughter of John Spencer-Churchill, 7th Duke of Marlborough

See also 
Sarah, Duchess of York, sometimes mistakenly referred to as Lady Sarah
Lady Sarah controversy
Princess Sarah (disambiguation)
Sarah (disambiguation)